Gijs Verdick (23 June 1994 – 9 May 2016) was a Dutch professional cyclist. In early 2016 he rode for Cyclingteam Jo Piels. On the night of May 2 and 3, 2016, he suffered two heart attacks during the under-23 Carpathian Couriers Race in Poland. On 8 May he was brought from Poland to the Isala hospital in Zwolle, Netherlands, where he died the day after. After his death, several of his organs were offered up for donation.

Major results

2014
Nacht van Hengelo
2015
Nacht van Hengelo

References

External links

1994 births
2016 deaths
Dutch male cyclists
People from Lochem
Cyclists who died while racing
Sport deaths in Poland
Cyclists from Gelderland